Thomas S. Williamson III (born 1990) is an American actor best known for his recurring role as AJ Hensdale on the Freeform drama, The Fosters.

Early life and education
Williamson was born Thomas S. Williamson III in Washington, D.C., the son of Tom Williamson and Shelley Brazier. He is one of four children. His father was a senior attorney at Covington & Burling, a prestigious law firm in D.C. He attended Gonzaga College High School where he played basketball, track and field and participated in the musical theatre program. Williamson graduated in 2008. He attended the University of Southern California and graduated in 2012 with a degree in communications and media studies.

Career
In 2013, Williamson appeared in the horror film All Cheerleaders Die, a remake of Lucky McKee's 2001 film. The film marked his featured film debut. In October 2014, Williamson was one of 20 actors to participate in the ABC Network's 34th annual Talent Showcase. In April 2015, it was announced that Williamson had been cast in the recurring role of AJ in the ABC Family series, The Fosters. Williamson appeared opposite Sharon Stone in the 2017 release, Running Wild.

Filmography

References

External links
 

1990 births
Male actors from Washington, D.C.
Gonzaga College High School alumni
University of Southern California alumni
American male television actors
Living people